Big Marsh (Scottish Gaelic:A' Mhaise Mhór) is a community in the Canadian province of Nova Scotia, located  in Antigonish County.

References

Communities in Antigonish County, Nova Scotia